Acció ('Action') was a weekly newspaper published from Tarragona, Spain 1936–1937. It was the local organ of the Iberian Communist Youth (JCI), the youth wing of POUM. The first issue was published on 1 October 1936. Ricard Garriga Salvadó was the director of Acció. When Garriga was sent to the front, Josep Vilar took over as director of the newspaper. The offices of the newspaper were located inside the POUM-JCI office in downtown Tarragona (Casa Rosell, which had hosted the CEDA office before the war), at Rambla 14 Abril on the corner with Carrer de Girona. The newspaper was printed at Suc de Torres & Virgili.

Acció was a bilingual publication. The issues of Acció carried four pages. The format was 503 x 350 mm. It was sold at 15 céntimos per issue.

Acció disappeared after the events of May 1937.

References

1936 establishments in Spain
1937 disestablishments in Spain
Catalan-language newspapers
Communist newspapers
Defunct newspapers published in Spain
Newspapers published in Catalonia
Publications established in 1936
Publications disestablished in 1937
POUM
Defunct weekly newspapers
Spanish-language newspapers